Archiv für Naturgeschichte was a German-language journal for natural history. It was founded by A. F. A. Wiegmann in 1835. The journal was published in Berlin from 1835 to 1926. There were 92 published volumes. From 1912 to 1926 each volume was published in two sections, namely, Abteilung A: Original-Arbeiten & Abteilung B: Jahres-Berichte. Abteilung A (i.e. Section A) published original articles on zoology. Abteilung B (i.e. Section B) published yearly reports on zoological articles published in the preceding year.

References

External links
Archiv für Naturgeschichte | Hathi Trust Digital Library
The International Plant Names Index, Publication Details, Archiv für Naturgeschichte
 

Annual journals
German-language journals
Multidisciplinary scientific journals
Zoology journals
Publications established in 1835
Publications disestablished in 1926